Oliver Sean (born Oliver Sean Alvares; 11 October 1979) is a singer-songwriter, based in England, United Kingdom. His brand of music is known for its Americana influence with acoustic rock, world and contemporary undertones.

Born in Goa, India, Sean has lived most of his life abroad, including Dubai and the UK. His eclectic global music style is the trademark for his brand. It's attributed to his mixed Portuguese and Goan Lineage. Sean's discography with WOA International started in 1999 with his single "There She Is Again" at the age of 19, having recorded it three years earlier.

As a composer, record producer and filmmaker Sean's productions have been broadcast on International channels including MTV and Vh1 and has had several No.1 chart listings and major top 10 chart rankings worldwide. Some of the highlights of his recognition has been Nomination for the MTV Europe Music Awards 2012 and hitting the Billboard Top 10 charts across multiple genres, including the Billboard Blues Album Charts and World Singles Charts. Some of his breakout chart successes have been Billboard Top 10 at number 6 on the Billboard World Digital Song Sales Charts in 2019 with ,Doing That (Time. Love. Happiness)  and #8 on the Billboard Top 10 Blues Album Charts with his album 'Devil is Back' in August 2020. The singer songwriter also secured his first UK top 50 on the Official UK Album Download Charts Official Chart Company. In 2020 the artist made it into the Billboard Top 10 Artist charts  and secured another Billboard Blues Album Chart hit with his 2021 lockdown album Garage Sessions, Vol.1,

He is a member of the Recording Academy and a voting member for the Grammy Awards.

Life and career

Early life 
Oliver Sean grew up in Goa, India. His mother is Goan Portuguese and his father is American. He was born to a musically inclined family as all of his uncles were musicians. He started to write songs when he was 11 years old and had a band at school. At the age of 13, Sean turned into a professional and played for weddings in his uncle's band. Oliver Sean's career was launched in his teens. When he was 17, he formed his own band called Cloud 9.

Breakthrough years (1999-2004) 
Sean's breakthrough is traced back to 1999 when his discography with W.O.A. Entertainment began, featuring the single "There She Is Again". His debut album was I Like It. This album was nominated for 'International Album of the Year' by AVMax in 2003/04. Also, one of the key moments was in the UK, when a studio head secured him a spot on Showcase TV that was aired on Sky/Granada TV.

Musical career (2005-2010) 
In 2006, Sean was involved with writing music for the French Government for the tourism campaign of the Massif Region and official song for the Goa Floats at the India Republic Day Parade that won the top honors in 2006. In 2008, Sean came out with his second studio album called Darna Chod Do. The name of this album comes from Goan street slang.

So Good and All I Remember (2011-2012) 
Sean's third studio album So Good (2011) hit the Vh1 Top 10 for his single "Movies" from the album on 4 June 2011, Featured album spot at the Virgin Megastores in Dubai, a Vh1 Specials feature in India and the MTV Europe Music Awards 2012 nomination in the MTV EMA Best India/Worldwide Act category. Sean released an Americana single titled "All I Remember" in 2012. It was released in the US simultaneously announcing his first major US Tour. The music video for "All I Remember" was a featured video on Vh1 India's music channel and went on to hit the No.1 Spot on the Artist Aloud Charts (India Today Group). Sean made his debut in film music as a music director when he composed the Soundtrack for a popular Bollywood International film Cutting Chai released in 2012.

Christmas and Animal Welfare (2013-2015) 
Making a foray into holiday music Sean recorded his version of the Charles Brown hit "Please Come Home for Christmas" in 2013 followed by his Christmas EP Unplugged Christmas releasing shortly thereafter. In February 2015 Oliver Sean released a live and unplugged EP titled Bootleg Recordings Vol.1 dedicated towards animal welfare and followed that up with the Stripped Down Summer Tour across New York, Costa Rica and England.

Focus on world and film music (2016-2018) 
Going deeper into world and film music in 2017, Sean composed the title track to a Goan (Konkani) feature film titled Devachem Planning. The singer's 4th studio album Devil in Blue Jeans was released on 31 August 2017.

The album was on the iTunes bestselling preorders list in the UK and two music videos/singles, New York and First Move, from the album are currently on rotation on Vh1 India/International, 9XO and RTP International. The third single from the album, "Walk Up and Kiss You", was selected by NARAS (National Academy of Recording Arts and Sciences) for the 61st Grammy Awards Nomination Ballots in Best American Roots Song and Best American Roots Performance categories. The single went on to hit No. 1 on the iTunes top 100 singles chart and iTunes Rock Chart. and the Devil in Blue Jeans album hit No. 2 on the iTunes Rock Album Chart and No. 14 on the iTunes Top 100 album chart.
 
At the Fall 2018 International Independent Film Awards Sean's single New York won Gold in the Best Music Video and Best Original Song categories.

Doing That and The Real Indie Project (2019 - 2020 ) 
Keeping with his world beat roots the singer songwriter released his single Doing That (Time, Love, Happiness) on 1 February 2019. The song hit No. 1 on iTunes in the US, Canada and Turkey and a No. 2 on iTunes UK. The single then went on to hit the official Billboard Charts, coming in at No. 6 on the world digital song sales charts, for the Week of 1 June 2019, with the Doing That (Time. Love. Happiness) single.

The artist was nominated for the 2020 Golden Fox Film Award, Best Music Video Category, as Director, for "Doing That (Time. Love. Happiness)".

Sean won Best Music Video and Original Song for 'Doing That (Time. Love. Happiness) at the 2021 Swedish International Film Festival 

Sean joined forces with several high-profile indie musicians in 2019 to form a new musical project titled 'The Real Indie Project'. The singer songwriter and the musicians from his Real Indie Project released a new version of the Legendary William Bell single "Everyday will be like a holiday" as their first official single, in time to celebrate the holidays.

Sean's album Devil is Back feat RIP (Real Indie Project) was released on 14 Aug and hit No.1 on the iTunes Blues Album charts. The album went on to hit the Official UK Album Download Chart Official Chart Company for the week of 21–27 August 2020 breaking into the top 50's at No. 52. The album broke into the Billboard Blues Album Chart at #8 for the week of 29 August 2020.

The Garage Sessions (2020 - Present Day ) 
In the midst of the pandemic Sean started streaming his live performances from his home and studio, for fans around the world to watch and connect with the artist one on one. This was called Garage Sessions, which garnered interest from fans and media around the world. The success of the livestreaming led to  Sean recording an album that captured the feel of his weekly Garage Sessions livestream performance. The Garage Sessions, Vol.1 Album was released on 23 July. The album hit the Billboard Blues Album charts at #14 on 3 August 2021.

Sean got his first Christmas Number 1 in the UK on the Blues Charts in 2021, with his version of Everyday Will be like a Holiday.

Blues Dance (Worldbeat), which was released during the same time as the Garage Sessions Vol. 1 album went on to hit #1 in the US and the UK simultaneously on the iTunes Easy Listening charts, at the start on 2022.

Other ventures 
Sean has produced both his own and various international artists' music and music videos. He also hosts his own weekly radio show and podcast WOAFM99.

Awards and achievements 

 AVMax International Album of the Year Nominee 2003 
 MTV Super Select - I Like It, 2004 
 MTV Most Wanted - I Like It, 2004 
 B4U International TV Special - Live TV Concert, 2006 
 Headiner at International Film Festival of India (IFFI) - 2006 
 MTV Exclusive - Darna Chod Do, Music Video, 2008 
 Zee TV Special TV Feature - Darna Chod Do, 2008 
 Big Goemkar (Goan of Year) - Big FM, 2009 
 Vh1 Top 10 (No.10) - Movies, Music Video 2011 
 MTV Europe Music Awards Nominee 2012
 Grammy Nomination Considerations 54th, 55th, 56th, 57th & 58th Grammy Awards. 14. Vh1 Specials Documentary - 2012
 No 1 on Artist Aloud Charts - All I Remember Single 2013
 Reverbnation No.1 (World Music Genre), 2014
 No.1 on N1M Americana Charts (Worldwide) - Single 'All I Remember' 2015
 Reverbnation No.1 across UK (Americana Genre), 2015 
 No.1 on N1M Soft Rock Charts (Worldwide) - Single 'Movies' 2015 
 No.1 on N1M Americana Charts (Worldwide) - Single 'All I Remember' 2015 
 Breaking Music Video on 9XO - New York Single 2016
 iTunes Bestselling Pre Orders List (UK) - Devil in Blue Jeans 31 August 2017
 No.1 on iTunes Top 100 Charts Turkey - 22 Nov 2018 (Song: Walk up and Kiss you)
 No.1 on iTunes Top 10 Rock Singles Turkey - 24 November 2018 (Song: New York)
 No.2 on Album Charts (Rock) iTunes Mexico - 29 November 2018
 No.14 on Album Charts (Top 100) iTunes Mexico - 29 November 2018
 Gold Award for New York in Best Music Video at International Independent Film Awards - Dec 2018 
 Gold Award for New York in Best Original Song at International Independent Film Awards - Dec 2018
 Billboard World Singles Charts  #6 for Doing That (Time. Love. Happiness) - June 2019
 Billboard Blues Album Charts #8 for Devil is Back - Aug 2020 
 Billboard Blues Album Charts # 14 for Garage Sessions, Vol.1 - Aug 2021 
 Winner at Swedish International Film Festival (Doing That, Best Music Video) - Sep 2021
 Christmas Day No.1 on the iTunes UK Blues Charts with Everyday Will Be Like A Holiday - Dec 2021
 No. 1 on the iTunes US and iTunes UK easy listening charts with Blues Dance (Worldbeat) - Jan 2022

Discography

There She Is Again (Single – WOA Records/W.O.A International– 1999
I Like It (LP – WOA Records/W.O.A International) – 2002
I Like It (Album Re-Release – Times Music/WOA Records/W.O.A International) – 2003
Libran Mind (Film Score) – 2004
Darna Chod Do (LP – WOA Records/W.O.A International / Crescendo BMG) – 2007
Christmas Time (Single – WOA Records/W.O.A International) – 2008
Goa Chillout Zone Vol.1 (Compilation – WOA Records/W.O.A International) – 2009
So Good (Single – WOA Records/WOA International) – 2010
So Good – The Album (LP – WOA Records) – 2011
NuBreed of the Middle East (Compilation – Daxxar) – 2011
Cutting Chai (Film soundtrack – WOA Records/WOA International) – 2012
All I Remember (Single – WOA Records/WOA International) – 2012
Christmas Unplugged (LIVE EP – WOA Records/WOA International) – 2012
Please come home for Christmas (Single – WOA Records/WOA International) – 2013
The Bootleg Recordings Vol.1 (LIVE EP – WOA Records/WOA International) - 2015
Unplugged Christmas (LIVE EP – WOA Records/WOA International) – 2016
New York (Single – WOA Records/WOA International) – 2016
First Move (Single – WOA Records/WOA International – 2017
Devachem Planning (Movie Soundtrack/Title Track for Konkani Feature Film Film Score) - 2017
Decade of Hits (LP/Compilation – WOA Records/WOA International) – 2017
Devil in Blue Jeans (LP – WOA Records/WOA International) – 2017
 Doing That (Time. Love. Happiness) (Single – WOA Records/WOA International) – 2019
 Everyday will be like a holiday - (Single – WOA Records/WOA International) – 2019
 Devil is Back - (EP -  [WOA Records/WOA International) – 2020
 Garage Sessions, Vol.1 - (Album -  [WOA Records/WOA International) – 2021

Filmography

I Like It (Oliver Sean), Music Video, Actor / Producer – 2002
Darna Chod Do (Oliver Sean), Music Video, Actor / Executive Producer  – 2007
Darna Chod Do Remix (Oliver Sean), Music Video, Actor / Executive Producer – 2007
(Saurabh), Music Video, Executive Producer- 2009
Peace Remix (Saurabh), Music Video, Executive Producer – 2009
 Cutting Chai (Bollywood Film), Composer/Music Director
So Good (Oliver Sean), Music Video, Actor/Producer/Director – 2011
Movies (Oliver Sean), Music Video, Actor/producer/Director – 2011
Dichotomy (Kotadama), Music Video, Director – 2011
Love Song (Jade Steel), Music Video, Director – 2011
So Naive (Eric Dulle), Music Video, Director – 2011
Alone (Oliver Sean), Music Video, actor, producer, Director – 2012
Vh1 Specials – Oliver Sean, Documentary, Director – 2012
All I Remember (Oliver Sean), Music Video, actor, producer, Director – 2012
Diacronia (Nagmah), Music Video, Director - 2015
Necessary Evil (Laura Ainsworth), Music Video, Director - 2015
Detroit on a Roll (Lorraine Milton), Music Video, Director - 2015
New York (Oliver Sean), Music Video, Director - 2017
First Move (Oliver Sean), Music Video, Director - 2018
 Doing That (Time. Love. Happiness) (Oliver Sean), Music Video, Director - 2019
 Everyday will be like a holiday (Oliver Sean feat. Real Indie Project), Music Video, Director 2019
 Devil is Back (Oliver Sean), Music Video, Director 2020

References

External links

1979 births
Living people
Musicians from Goa
Singers from Goa
Indian male singer-songwriters
Portuguese male singer-songwriters
21st-century Portuguese male singers
21st-century Indian male singers
21st-century Indian singers
Portuguese people of American descent
Indian people of American descent